Georgia wine refers to wine made from grapes grown in the U.S. state of Georgia.  Georgia was an important winegrowing region of the United States in the 19th century, and by 1900 ranked sixth in production among U.S. states.

The state of Georgia first prohibited alcoholic beverages before many other states, in 1907 and subsequently the Georgian wine industry was decimated by Prohibition in the United States. The modern wine industry of Georgia only began in the 1980s.  Georgia is the national leader in the production of wine from the Muscadine grape.

In 2014 the Upper Hiwassee Highlands AVA, which also extends into North Carolina, was designated to include parts of three extreme northern counties.

References

External links
 [https://www.georgiawineproducers.org/Georgia Wine Producers Association 

 
Wine regions of the United States by state